Nazim Hajiyev or Nazim Gadzhiyev (1944-2016) was an activist and leader of the Lezgin movement "Sadval" (Unity), advocating for the autonomy or independence of the Lezgin people. He was murdered in 2016.

References 

1944 births
2016 deaths
Russian activists
Russian murder victims